Gibbovalva magnoliae is a moth of the family Gracillariidae. It is known from Japan (Hokkaidō and Honshū).

The wingspan is 6.8-9.2 mm.

The larvae feed on Magnolia heptapetala, Magnolia hypoleuca and Magnolia obovata. They mine the leaves of their host plant.

References

Acrocercopinae
Moths of Japan
Moths described in 1988